The 2020–21 Portland Pilots men's basketball team represented the University of Portland during the 2020–21 NCAA Division I men's basketball season. The Pilots were led by fifth-year head coach Terry Porter until he was fired February 5, 2021 after 17 games. He was replaced by interim head coach Ben Johnson for the rest of the season. They played their home games at the Chiles Center as members of the West Coast Conference. In a season limited due to the ongoing COVID-19 pandemic, they finished the season 6–15, 0–11 in WCC play to finish in last place. They lost to Santa Clara in the first round of the WCC tournament.

On March 22, the school named Eastern Washington head coach Shantay Legans the team's new head coach.

Previous season 
The Pilots finished the 2019–20 season 9–23, 1–15 in WCC play to finish in last place. They lost in the first round of the WCC tournament to Santa Clara.

Offseason

Departures

Incoming Transfers

Recruiting class of 2020

Roster

Schedule and results
 
|-
!colspan=9 style=| Non-conference regular season

|-
!colspan=9 style=| WCC regular season

|-
!colspan=9 style=| WCC tournament

Source: Schedule

References

Portland
Portland Pilots men's basketball seasons
Portland Pilots men's basketball
Portland Pilots men's basketball
Port
Port